Van Herpen is a surname. Notable people with the surname include:

 Iris van Herpen (born 1984), Dutch fashion designer
 Jan van Herpen (1920–2008), Dutch journalist, publicist, and editor
 Jos van Herpen (born 1962), Dutch footballer

Surnames of Dutch origin